Kootenay Direct Airlines Ltd. was an airline based in Nelson, British Columbia, Canada. It operated charter services to destinations in British Columbia, Canada and the United States. Its main base was in Nelson, British Columbia.

See also 
 List of defunct airlines of Canada

References 

Airlines established in 2006
Airlines disestablished in 2009
Charter airlines of Canada
Companies based in British Columbia
Nelson, British Columbia
Aviation in British Columbia
Defunct airlines of Canada